The AC 47 was a French anti-tank gun of 47 mm calibre.  It was principally used in the ouvrages and casemates of the Maginot Line in the late 1930s; another version was created for naval use.

The AC 47 was principally used as a defensive weapon, since its portability was intentionally limited to prevent the weapon from being turned on defending troops if a fortification was captured.

Characteristics 
 Length of the tube : 2.52 m (8.26 ft)
 Rifling: 16, right-handed
 Penetration at 1000 m : 45 – 60 mm (1.77 - 2.36 in)

See also
47 mm APX anti-tank gun

World War II weapons of France
World War II anti-tank guns
47 mm artillery
Military equipment introduced in the 1930s